Kao Shao-yuan (born 11 June 1988) is a former professional Taiwanese tennis player.

In her career, she won 18 doubles titles on the ITF Women's Circuit.
Kao has a career-high singles ranking by the Women's Tennis Association (WTA) of 630, achieved on 4 December 2006. She also has a career-high WTA doubles ranking of 213, set on 6 June 2011.

In 2014, she played her last match on the pro circuit.

ITF finals

Singles (0–1)

Doubles (18–12)

External links
 
 

1988 births
Living people
Taiwanese female tennis players
Sportspeople from Taipei
21st-century Taiwanese women